Deng Jiagui (born 1951; 邓家贵) is a Chinese businessman, and brother-in-law of 
Xi Jinping, who is current General Secretary of the Chinese Communist Party and paramount leader of China since 2012.

Deng Jiagui is a Canadian citizen and resident of Hong Kong SAR. He has"made a fortune in real estate development" and is mentioned in the Panama Papers.

In 2012, Bloomberg reported that Deng Jiagui and his wife Qi Qiaoqiao had holdings in Shenzhen Yuanwei Investment Co worth $288 million, and wholly owned other companies in the Yuanwei group worth $84.8 million - a total of $372.8 million.

Deng, Qi, and their daughter, Zhang Yannan "own millions of dollars in luxury properties in Hong Kong, Shenzhen and Beijing".

Property
In June 2012, Bloomberg News revealed that the Xi Jinping family had more than $300 million in assets. In January 2014 and April 2016, the International Consortium of Investigative Journalists published reports from leaked documents revealing that relatives of several senior Chinese officials, including Xi's brother-in-law Deng Jiagui, had set up offshore companies to hide huge amounts of wealth. According to the leaked documents released in 2016, Deng Jiagui set up two shell companies in the British Virgin Islands in 2009. Deng was the sole director and shareholder of the shell companies, and the purpose was unknown. But the two companies ceased to operate before Xi became the CCP General Secretary at the 18th Communist Party Congress in November 2012.

In November 2015, the New York Times revealed after the Xi family has stakes in the Wanda group, Wanda group chairman Wang Jianlin public class at Harvard University in the United States acknowledges that Mr.Xi's sister and her husband Deng Jiagui JiQiao bridge once hold shares in the Wanda group, but IPO in Wanda company two months ago has sold its holdings of shares. Qi Qiaoqiao and Deng transferred ownership of the holding company to Xu in October 2013, according to The New York Times. Wang Jianlin said the Xi family's holding of shares had nothing to do with corruption, and that the fact that they sold their shares before the IPO and lost the opportunity to make a big profit was a sign of Xi's stricter rule of the country. According to the investigation, Qi Qiaoqiao and Deng Jiagui transferred their shares to Xu Zhainai, a deputy manager of Qinchuan Dadi Investment Co, who had worked with them for 13 years, leading VOA to surmised that Xu was the white glove' holding the shares on their behalf.

Information exposure cases
In the aftermath of the “Esu Wiki(恶俗维基)” case that led to the collective sentencing of 24 people for publishing personal information about Chinese leader Xi Jinping's daughter Xi Mingze and brother-in-law, the victims' families have broken their days of silence and accused police in Maoming, Guangdong province, of fabricating wrongful convictions. Niu Tengyu, an operation, and maintenance officer of the website, was found to be the main culprit and sentenced to 14 years in prison. Twenty-three other members also received sentences ranging from one sentence to another. Twenty-four people complained that they had been tortured.

The Maonan District Court in Maoming, Guangdong province, on Friday, sentenced 24 young people to 14 years in prison for their role in an online case. Among them was Niu Tengyu, a 20-year-old who was accused of being the "main culprit" in the case.

The case, which has been described as highly politicized, follows the publication of personal information about Xi's daughter, Xi Mingze, and Deng Jiagui, Xi's brother-in-law. The mothers of Nu Teng-woo and other convicted men are planning to appeal.

Niu Teng-yu's mother said the authorities had rigged a major political case against Xi and Deng because of information leaks. Under the background of the failure to arrest the website's director outside China, the Maoming police in Guangdong Province, who was in charge of the case, replaced the "Esu wiki" which was involved with the "Zhi Na wiki", arrested a large number of "Esu wiki" members, and reported this to the central government as a gift for the 70th anniversary of the People's Republic of China, and was rewarded for it.

In 24 other children of being arrested, had 10 children parents published an open letter and information leak points out that the leaders of loved ones, because the public security system and related personnel entry and exit system, and the price are selling "political celebrities" personal information, leading to the occurrence of "political incident" celebrity entry, there is no indication this has anything to do with the case of all the parties.

Chen Jiangang, a US-based Chinese human rights lawyer, told Radio Free Asia on February 18 that the case was not transparent, but his experience in handling previous cases suggested that because Xi's relatives were involved, the case could have been directed by superiors or taken as an opportunity for local officials to file a case claiming credit and loyalty to Xi.

Panama Papers case
Panama Papers is a survey by the international press alliance (ICIJ) revealed some confidential documents, contains the law firm since the 1970 s about 21.4 offshore financial company listed in the detailed data of 11.5 million pens, revealed the national political figures, and powerful chaebol are deliberately hide, Undisclosed overseas assets.

In September 2009, Mr. Deng became an independent director and shareholder of two British Virgin Islands shell companies. The two companies are known as Best Effect Enterprises Ltd and Wealming International Limited. Mossack Fonseca helped Deng obtain the former company seal. The purpose of the two companies is unknown. At the time, Mr. Xi was a member of the nine-member Politburo Standing Committee. When Xi Jinping was appointed general secretary of the Communist Party and paramount leader in November 2012, Deng's two companies were put on hold.

The Chinese mainland's media rarely report on the word "Panama Paper", with keywords censored.

Many Hong Kong and Taiwan media reported the incident and mentioned Xi's family. According to Hong Kong's Apple Daily, the two companies are registered at Jaffe Road in Hong Kong. The reporter came to the door according to the registered address and found that the door of the unit was no different from the general residence, and there was no information such as the name of any company posted. The reporter rang the doorbell but no one responded, and no sound could be heard inside the house. Neighbors said the unit is a general residence, "usually very rare, but it is someone to live with."

Investment career
In August 2009, Wanda Commercial Real Estate Co Ltd. (hereinafter referred to as Wanda Commercial), a subsidiary of Wanda Group, commissioned Galaxy Securities and China International Capital Corporation, the largest securities company in China at that time, to operate the private placement. The price of the private placement was 13 yuan per share, raising a total of more than 4 billion yuan, creating a new record for the private placement scale of China's private enterprises at that time. Among them, Qiqiao Bridge, along with Beijing Qinchuan Dadi Investment Co which is controlled by Deng Jiagui, and more than a dozen other companies participated in a private placement. Wanda Commercial now claims to be the world's largest commercial property company, with a market capitalization of more than HK $230bn.

According to Bloomberg, Deng Jiagui's other investment timing is also very good, in a state-owned company to invest in rare earth metals. In 2008, Deng Jiagui's Shanghai Dynasty Investment Company bought a 30 percent stake in Jiangxi Rare Earths for 450 million yuan ($71 million), according to a bond statement.
Deng owns 60% of the Shanghai dynasty. In the company's registration file, there is a copy of Deng's Chinese identity card, the same as the one found in the far branch documents. According to the documents, the group's relevant management also served as vice chairman and chief financial officer of Jiangxi Rare Earth.
China has a near-monopoly on the production of rare-earth metals, and the investment comes at a time when China is tightening controls on production and exports of rare piles of earth. The policy caused the price of some rare earth metals to soar fourfold in 2011.
In January 2013, however, just after Mr. Xi came to power, Mr. Deng completed the sale of a 50 percent stake in an investment firm in Beijing. According to the buyer's statement, the move is part of an ongoing move by the Xi family to withdraw from the investment. From 2012 to this year, Mr. Xi's sister, Qiqiaoqiao, and brother-in-law, Deng Jiagui, withdrew their investments in at least 10 companies, mainly in mining and real estate. The couple's exit from the company was worth hundreds of millions of dollars through a sale, a black-out, and one of the transfers of assets to a close business partner.
Including Baum and his wife JiQiao bridge is more than the company's legal representative, to be sure: Deng Jiagui is a Beijing-based company legal representative, in 2009 in a private placement, the company with 30 million yuan to buy one of the largest developers in China Dalian Wanda commercial real estate group, 0.8% of the company. Dalian Wanda Commercial had sales of 95.3 billion yuan ($15 billion) last year.

Family

Deng Jiagui and Qi Qiaoqiao have a daughter, Zhang Yannan.

His current wife is Qi Qiaoqiao. Qi met Deng Jiagui in 1990. In 1991, Deng bought a flat in Bauma Hill Garden in Hong Kong for HK $3 million and then gave it as a token of love. They got married in 1996.

Father-in-law, Xi Zhongxun, a native of Fuping, Shaanxi province, was one of the eight senior members of the Communist Party of China and former vice-premier of the State Council and vice chairman of the Standing Committee of the National People's Congress.

Mother-in-law, Qixin, was Xi Zhongxun's second wife.

The sister-in-law Qi An An (former name Xi An) and her husband Wu Long live in Melbourne, Australia, as permanent residents of Australia; It is also the actual owner of Beijing New Post Communications and Shenzhen Datang Mobile Communications.

Brother-in-law Xi Jinping, the current general secretary of the Chinese Communist Party Central Committee, state president, chairman of the Central Military Commission.

Xi Yuanping, a brother-in-law, is the current president of the International Association for Energy Conservation and Environmental Protection.

Evaluation
As a relative of China's top leader Xi Jinping, Deng Jiagui has received mixed reviews from many quarters. Deng Jiagui first came to public attention in a report published in 2016. Because of Deng Jiagui's special status and a large amount of money involved, Deng Jiagui has also become one of the representatives of criticism. But Deng had sold shares in growing companies during Xi's reign to prove he would not interfere too much in the market, leading many to believe that Deng was ceding control of the economy in response to Xi's crackdown on corruption.
Deng Jiagui's wife Qiqiao Qiao also decided to surname Qi to avoid the outside world guessing that she was a relative of the state leader and received special treatment, including Deng Jiagui at the beginning of the business did not have anyone to help, after the success of the career did not indulge in enjoyment. So there is also a part of the people on Deng Jiagui's evaluation biased to appreciate a little more. Xi's sister and brother-in-law have already made great sacrifices for Xi. It is reported that the building where brother-in-law Xi lives in Hong Kong is a very unremarkable street ".
The article also concluded that the Communist Party had not disclosed anything against Xi, but rather confirmed that he had done a good job of preventing corruption in the years before the Panama Paper was disclosed.

References

Alexa Olesen and Wen Yu(Apr 7, 2016 – 4.00am)
"The Panama Papers: China's elite hold extensive overseas companies"

1951 births
Chinese businesspeople
Living people
People named in the Panama Papers
Xi Jinping family